Litton may refer to:

Places 
 Litton, Derbyshire, England
 Litton, North Yorkshire, England
 Litton, Somerset, England
 Litton, Mississippi, United States, an unincorporated community

Other uses 
 Litton (surname)
 Litton Entertainment, an American television program producer
 Litton Industries, a defunct conglomerate
 Litton, an appliance brand owned by Maytag, acquired from the defunct Litton Industries

See also
 
 
 Lytton (disambiguation)